Gramm is a surname. Notable people with the surname include:

Donald Gramm (1927–1983), American bass-baritone
Lou Gramm (born 1950), musician with the band Foreigner
Phil Gramm (born 1942), American politician
Wendy Lee Gramm (born 1945), think tank chairman

Fictional characters:
Jack Gramm, character in 2008 film 88 minutes